The alkali–carbonate reaction is an alteration process first suspected in the 1950s in Canada for the degradation of concrete containing dolomite aggregates.

Alkali from the cement might react with the dolomite crystals present in the aggregate inducing the production of brucite, (MgOH)2, and calcite (CaCO3). This mechanism was tentatively proposed by Swenson and Gillott (1964) and may be written as follows:

CaMg(CO3)2 + 2 NaOH -> Mg(OH)2 + CaCO3 + Na2CO3

Brucite (Mg(OH)2), could be responsible for the volumetric expansion after de-dolomitisation of the aggregates, due to absorption of water.

(2005).

Na2CO3 + Ca(OH)2 -> CaCO3 + 2 NaOH

The sum of the two above mentioned reactions leading to the ultimate production of brucite and calcium carbonate can be written as follows:

CaMg(CO3)2 + Ca(OH)2 -> Mg(OH)2 + 2 CaCO3

The alkali-carbonate reaction is much less understood than the alkali-silica reaction. Both reactions share in common the continuous regeneration of the sodium hydroxide (NaOH) after the reaction of soluble sodium carbonate or sodium silicate with calcium hydroxide, . However, impure dolomitic aggregates also often contain clay impurities, and small amounts of pyrite and organic matter. The alkali-carbonate reaction could therefore also simply hide an alkali-silica or an alkali-silicate reaction. Anyway a chemical coupling between ACR and ASR cannot be ruled out.

See also
 Alkali–aggregate reaction
 Alkali–silica reaction
 Calthemite: Secondary calcium carbonate deposit growing under man-made structures
 Pozzolanic reaction

External links
 Cement.org | Alkali-aggregate reaction

References

Building materials
Carbonates
Catalysis
Cement
Chemical reactions
Concrete
Fracture mechanics
Magnesium compounds
Materials degradation
Mechanical failure modes
Patterns
Pavements
Silicates